High school radio are radio stations located at high schools and usually operated by its students with faculty supervision. The oldest extant high school AM radio station is AM 1450 KBPS in Portland, Oregon. Portland radio station KBPS, first licensed in 1923, is the second oldest radio station overall in the city of Portland.  The student body of Benson Polytechnic High School purchased the transmitter and other equipment from Stubbs Electric in Portland for $1,800. Money for the purchase of the station came from student body funds.
On March 23, 1923, the student body of Benson was licensed by the federal government to operate a radio station using 200 watts of power at 834 kilocycles. The first call letters of the station were KFIF. The station made its formal debut on the air and was officially dedicated in early May of 1923, between the hours of 9:30 p.m. to 10:30 p.m., on the opening night of the 5th annual Benson Tech Show. In spring of 1930, the call letters changed from KFIF to KBPS, for Benson Polytechnic High School. In 1941 KBPS stopped sharing its frequency with other stations and moved to 1450 AM on the dial where it remains today. In 1971 the FCC gave the station permission to increase daytime transmitting power to 1000 watts. Nighttime power was 250 watts.  KBPS is now licensed for 1000 watts 24-hours a day. The KBPS studios, transmitter and 200 foot self-supporting steel tower are located at the rear of the Benson campus. AM 1450 still broadcasts 24/7/365 and the KBPS Radio Broadcasting program at Benson High School still teaches today's students about radio broadcasting and audio content creation.

The oldest extant high school FM radio stations began broadcasting in the 1940s, with the advent of the 88–108 MHz FM radio band.  Because the 88-92 MHz region was dedicated to non-commercial broadcasting, this allowed for schools to fairly easily obtain licenses from the FCC.  The oldest HS station on FM is WNAS in New Albany, Indiana, which started broadcasting in May 1949. The station is still broadcasting today.  WHHS, Haverford Senior High School's radio station also started in 1949, located in Havertown, Pennsylvania. As the FM band increased in listenership in the next few decades, the number of HS stations increased with it.  In addition to this number, there have always been untold numbers of unlicensed stations using carrier current (popular through the 1970s), extremely low power or "Part 15" stations, and closed-circuit broadcasting.  Many of the licensed stations are assigned to suburban school districts in a few large metro areas: Chicago, Indianapolis, Detroit, Boston, Philadelphia, Seattle and to a lesser extent San Francisco and Cleveland.

After a steady decline in their numbers in the 1980s and '90s, the availability of LPFM licenses has renewed interest in HS radio.

John Drury High School Radio Awards

The John Drury Awards are a national competition for high school radio students. The Drury categories include Best Newscast, Best Station Promo, Best Sports Play-by-Play, and Best Public Service Announcement. The awards are held each October annually. The awards luncheon and ceremony is hosted by North Central College in Naperville, Illinois, just outside Chicago. The awards began as a small enterprise, but have grown each year with entries from stations in Michigan, Connecticut, Illinois, Tennessee, Iowa, and more. They are named in memory of John Drury, a television news anchorman from Chicago, IL.

The individual record for most awards won was set in 2007 by Wade Fink. Fink won seven awards, and had more points individually than any other station had total.

Points are awarded for each nomination and win in 14 categories. The station with the most points at the end of the ceremony wins "Station of the Year". The previous Station of the Year award winners are:

2005: 88.1 WLTL La Grange, Illinois
2006: 88.1 WBFH Bloomfield Hills, Michigan
2007: 88.1 WBFH Bloomfield Hills, Michigan
2008: 88.1 TIE WBFH Bloomfield Hills, Michigan and 88.1 WLTL La Grange, Illinois
2009: 88.1 WLTL La Grange, Illinois
2010: 88.1 WLTL La Grange, Illinois
2011: 90.3 WWPT Westport, Connecticut
2012: 88.1 WLTL La Grange, Illinois
2013-2014: 88.1 WBFH Bloomfield Hills, Michigan
2015: TIE 88.1 WBFH Bloomfield Hills, Michigan and WLTL La Grange, Illinois
2017: 90.3 WWPT Westport, Connecticut
2018-2019: 90.3 WWPT Westport, Connecticut
2019-2020: 88.1 WLTL La Grange, Illinois
2020-2021: 88.7 KVIT Mesa, Arizona
2021-2022: 88.1 WLTL La Grange, Illinois

List of radio stations

Canada

United States 

"Defunct" refers only to the stations themselves and not necessarily the schools that operated them.  The dates listed often refer to the year when the station's license was formally revoked by the FCC, though in most cases the station had ceased broadcasting years before that.

This list includes stations that were/are licensed by the FCC and other stations eligible for the John Drury National High School Radio Awards. No licensed HS stations are known to have existed in Alabama, New Mexico, North Dakota, Oklahoma, and South Dakota.

References

 Radio Station Treasury 1900–1946 by Tom Kneitel – A collection of reprints of public domain radio directories
 FCC regulation 73.561 regarding time sharing and required operating schedules for non-commercial educational stations

External links
John Drury High School Radio Awards official site
Ofcom, UK's radio licensing body – responsible for all school radio licenses

Radio formats
Secondary education in the United States